Georgy is a musical with a book by Tom Mankiewicz, lyrics by Carole Bayer Sager (listed as 'Carole Bayer'), and music by George Fischoff.

Based on the Margaret Forster novel Georgy Girl and the subsequent 1966 film adaptation, it tells the story of awkward, overweight, dowdy music teacher Georgy; her beautiful, self-centered roommate Meredith; Meredith's ne'er-do-well boyfriend Jos; and widower James Leamington, Georgy's father's wealthy employer, who has a lustful eye on the full-figured girl. When Meredith becomes pregnant, an overjoyed Georgy prepares for the blessed event, and soon after finds herself the baby's caregiver when the irresponsible Meredith disappears with a new beau. Georgy and Jos settle into an unlikely relationship threatened by his need to be independent, ultimately forcing Georgy to make a decision based on what's best for the child rather than her own needs and desires.

Production
During tryouts, producer Fred Coe hired Peter Stone to improve the script. The Broadway production was directed by Peter H. Hunt and choreographed by Howard Jeffrey. After seven previews, the show opened on February 26, 1970 at the Winter Garden Theatre, and closed after four performances. The cast included Dilys Watling as Georgy and John Castle as Jos, with Melissa Hart as Meredith and Stephen Elliott as James.

The critical consensus was that the intimate story did not lend itself to a large production with singing ensemble and dance routines, the score included nothing close to matching the film's bouncy title tune, and Watling was neither plain enough nor as vivacious as Lynn Redgrave, who had portrayed Georgy in the film, to do the character justice.

Watling was nominated for the Tony Award for Best Actress in a Musical (competing with Lauren Bacall for Applause and Katharine Hepburn for Coco), and Hart was nominated for Best Featured Actress in a Musical.

Song list

Act I
 Howdjadoo
 Make It Happen Now
 Ol' Pease Puddin'
 Just for the Ride
 So What?
 Georgy
 A Baby
 Howdjadoo (Reprise)
 That's How It Is
 There's a Comin' Together

Act II
 Something Special
 Half of Me
 Gettin' Back to Me
 Sweet Memory
 Georgy (Reprise)
 Life's a Holiday
 Make It Happen Now (Reprise)
 There's a Comin' Together (Reprise)

References

Ken Mandelbaum Not Since Carrie: Forty Years of Broadway Musical Flops, St. Martin's Press (1991), page 169

External links
 

1970 musicals
Broadway musicals
Musicals based on novels
Musicals based on films